Ilir Selmani (born 9 January 1978) is a Kosovar basketball coach and former player. He is the head coach of KB Trepça of the Kosovo Super League since 2016 and an assistant coach to the Kosovo men's national basketball team. In 2015 he was hired as the head coach of the Kosovo men's U-20 team.

References

External links
Eurobasket profile

1978 births
Living people
Kosovan men's basketball players
Point guards
Shooting guards